Jaqueline Cristian was the defending champion but chose not to participate.

Eva Lys won the title, defeating Anna Karolína Schmiedlová in the final, 6–2, 4–6, 6–2.

Seeds

Draw

Finals

Top half

Bottom half

References

External Links
Main Draw

Empire Women's Indoor 2 - Singles